List of basketball clubs in Spain sorted by division:

Men's

Liga Endesa (2018–19)

LEB Oro (2018–19)

LEB Plata (2018–19)

Liga EBA (2017–18)
Only teams with article

Group A–A
 CB Santurtzi SK
 Gallofa
 Grupo de Santiago Automoción
 Igualatorio Cantabria Estela
 Pas Piélagos
 Universidad de Burgos
 Zornotza ST

Group A–B
 Cenor Obradoiro CAB B
 Club Ourense Baloncesto B
 Gijón Basket
 Instituto Rosalía de Castro
 Leyma Básquet Coruña B
 Marín Peixegalego

Group B
 Gran Canaria B
 Movistar Estudiantes B
 Real Madrid B

Group C–A
 Club Bàsquet Tarragona

Group C–B
 CB Cornellà
 CB Valls Nutrion
 CB Vic Universitat de Vic
 MoraBanc Andorra B
 Palma Air Europa B
 Simply Olivar

Group D–A
 Unicaja Andalucía B

Group D–B
 Baloncesto Sevilla B

Group E
 Hispagán UPB Gandía
 Refitel Bàsquet Llíria
 UA Fundación Lucentum
 UCAM Murcia B
 Valencia Basket B

Women's

Liga Femenina de Baloncesto (2017–18)

See also
 Basketball in Spain

Notes

References

 
Spain sport-related lists
Spain clubs
Lists of sports clubs in Spain